Gravitcornutia is a genus of moths belonging to the family Tortricidae.

Species
Gravitcornutia aethesiana Razowski & Becker, 2001
Gravitcornutia altoperuviana Razowski & Wojtusiak, 2010
Gravitcornutia artificiosa Razowski & Becker, 2001
Gravitcornutia basiceramea Razowski & Becker, 2010
Gravitcornutia bertioga Razowski & Becker, 2010
Gravitcornutia camacae Razowski & Becker, 2010
Gravitcornutia caracae Razowski & Becker, 2010
Gravitcornutia cearae Razowski & Becker, 2010
Gravitcornutia cinnamomea Razowski & Becker, 2001
Gravitcornutia constricta Razowski & Becker, 2010
Gravitcornutia cornuta Razowski & Becker, 2001
Gravitcornutia curiosa Razowski & Becker, 2001
Gravitcornutia cuspis Razowski & Pelz, 2003
Gravitcornutia goianica Razowski & Becker, 2001
Gravitcornutia inapulana Razowski & Pelz, 2003
Gravitcornutia latiloba Razowski & Becker, 2010
Gravitcornutia major Razowski & Becker, 2001
Gravitcornutia minima Razowski & Becker, 2010
Gravitcornutia miserana Razowski & Becker, 2001
Gravitcornutia nasifera Razowski & Becker, 2010
Gravitcornutia nigribasana Razowski & Becker, 2001
Gravitcornutia ochrata Razowski & Becker, 2001
Gravitcornutia recta Razowski & Becker, 2010
Gravitcornutia rhomboidea Razowski & Becker, 2010
Gravitcornutia sodalicia Razowski & Becker, 2010
Gravitcornutia sterigmaspis Razowski & Becker, 2001
Gravitcornutia strigulata Razowski & Becker, 2010
Gravitcornutia trespolitana Razowski & Becker, 2001
Gravitcornutia tristis Razowski & Becker, 2001
Gravitcornutia umbrosa Razowski & Becker, 2001
Gravitcornutia zonata Razowski & Becker, 2001

See also
List of Tortricidae genera

References

 , 2001, Revta. brasil. Ent. 45: 257.
 , 2005, World Catalogue of Insects 5
 , 2010: Systematic and distributional data on Neotropical Euliini: Gravitcornutia Razowski & Becker (Lepidoptera: Tortricidae). Polish Journal of Entomology 79 (4): 411–432. Full article:  .
 , 2010: Tortricidae (Lepidoptera) from Peru. Acta Zoologica Cracoviensia 53B (1-2): 73-159. . Full article:  .

External links
tortricidae.com

 
Euliini
Tortricidae genera